Magnesium iron hexahydride is an inorganic compound with the formula Mg2FeH6.  It is a green diamagnetic solid that is stable in dry air. The material is prepared by heating a mixture of powdered magnesium and iron under high pressures of hydrogen:
2 Mg  +  Fe  +  3 H2   →   Mg2FeH6

Structure

The compound is isomorphous with K2PtCl6, i.e., their connectivities and structures are the same.  The [FeH6]4− centre adopts octahedral molecular geometry with Fe-H distances of 1.56 Å.  The Mg2+ centres are bound to the faces of the octahedron, with Mg-H distances of 2.38 Å.  Several related compounds are known including salts of [RuH6]4−, [OsH6]4−, and [PtH6]2− anions.

Soluble derivatives
Although Mg2FeH6 is not soluble in ordinary solvents, related derivatives are. For example,  the related salt Mg4Br4(THF)4FeH6 is soluble as are related alkoxides. Measurements on such compounds suggest that the hydride ligand exerts a weaker crystal field than cyanide.

References

Metal hydrides
Magnesium compounds
Iron(II) compounds
Iron complexes